"The Space Jungle" is a song by English acid house DJ and producer Adamski. The song is effectively a cover of "All Shook Up" by Elvis Presley, and features additional rap vocals by Ricardo da Force. The song was a top 30 hit in several countries in Europe and also in New Zealand, with its biggest success in Finland and the UK, peaking at No. 6 and No. 7. It also charted in the US, reaching No. 8 on the Billboard Dance Club Songs chart.

Charts

References

1990 songs
1990 singles
Adamski songs
Songs written by Elvis Presley
Songs written by Otis Blackwell
MCA Records singles